Klusterfuk is the third EP by rapper Tech N9ne. It was released on March 13, 2012.

Background 
Klusterfuk was first announced in early 2011. Then, in August 2011, Tech N9ne confirmed that he was about to begin work on Klusterfuk and his upcoming thirteenth studio album Welcome to Strangeland. In the post, he also confirmed that production for the EP would be handled entirely by ¡Mayday!. Tech has also expressed an interest in collaboration with alternative/blues musician Citizen Cope for the EP. Although it was later confirmed that Citizen Cope has agreed to work with Tech on the EP, the track didn't appear on Klusterfuk.

In October, 2011, Tech expressed an interest to collaborate with hip hop duo Aqualeo for the EP. It was later confirmed that the two are collaborating on a track for the EP. In December 2011, Tech announced that he was in the process of selecting the last 2 beats. On January 28, Tech N9ne announced that Klusterfuk was done, and it was sent to be mixed. The EP was released on March 13, 2012. It debuted at number 15 on the Billboard 200 with approximately 17,000 copies sold in its first week of release. It debuted at number 79 on the Canadian Albums Chart. As of March 25, 2012, Klusterfuk has sold 20,000 copies in the United States.

Track listing

References 

Tech N9ne EPs
Rap rock EPs
Concept albums
2012 EPs
Strange Music EPs